Madame Curie is a 1943 American biographical film made by Metro-Goldwyn-Mayer. The film was directed by Mervyn LeRoy and produced by Sidney Franklin from a screenplay by Paul Osborn, Paul H. Rameau, and Aldous Huxley (uncredited), adapted from the biography by Ève Curie. It stars Greer Garson, Walter Pidgeon, with supporting performances by Robert Walker,  Henry Travers, and Albert Bassermann.

The film tells the story of Polish-French physicist Marie Curie in 1890s Paris as she begins to share a laboratory with her future husband, Pierre Curie.

This was the fourth of nine onscreen pairings between Pidgeon and Garson.

In several versions, much of the scientific aspects of the film were cut down or edited out entirely. Turner Classic Movies has shown it unedited at 124 minutes.

Plot

Marie Sklodowska is a poor, idealistic student living in Paris and studying at the Sorbonne. She neglects her health and one day faints during class. Her tutor, Prof. Perot is sympathetic and, finding that she has no friends or family in Paris, invites her to a soirée his wife is throwing for a "few friends" (primarily professors and their wives). Among the many guests is physicist Pierre Curie, an extremely shy and absentminded man completely devoted to his work. He allows Marie to share his lab and finds that she is a gifted scientist. Appalled that she plans on returning to Poland to teach after graduation, rather than devoting her life to further study, he takes her to visit his family in their country home. Marie and Pierre both tend to concentrate on science to the extent that they don't realize until the last minute they have fallen in love. Even when Pierre asks Marie to be his wife, he does so in terms of reason, logic and chemistry.

Fascinated by a demonstration she saw as an undergraduate, of a pitchblende rock that seems to generate enough energy to take small photographs, Marie decides to make the rock's energy the subject of her doctoral study. The measurements she takes don't seem to add up, and she decides there must be a  third radioactive element in the rock in addition to the two she knows are in it. In the midst of discussing this, she discloses offhandedly to Pierre's family that she is pregnant.

The physics department at the Sorbonne refuses to fund their research without more proof of the element's existence, but allows them to use a dilapidated old shed across the courtyard from the physics building. In spite of its disadvantages, they import eight tons of pitchblende ore and cook it down to look for the element they call radium. In spite of inability to separate out pure radium, they know something is definitely there, as Marie's hands are being burned. They hit on a tedious method of crystallization to arrive at pure radium.

Now world-famous, they go on vacation to rest after all the press conferences and the Nobel Prize. They're granted a new laboratory by the university; before its dedication Marie shows off her new dress, inspiring Pierre to go get her a set of earrings to go with it. Walking home in the rain, he absentmindedly crosses the street in front of a delivery wagon and is run down and killed.  Marie almost loses her mind, but after the concerned Prof. Perot counsels her, she rallies when she remembers Pierre's words that if one of them is gone, the other must go on working just the same. Finally, Marie gives a speech at the 25th anniversary celebration of the discovery of radium, expressing her belief that science is the path to a better world.

Cast

Production
Universal Studios quickly bought the rights to Ève Curie's book, with Irene Dunne in mind to play Marie. Dunne traveled to Europe and met with Ève Curie to discuss the project, but Universal sold the property to Metro-Goldwyn-Mayer a few years later. In March 1938, Anita Loos contacted Aldous Huxley, then recently moved to Hollywood, saying she would put him in touch with MGM for a writing contract. Madame Curie was originally set for production in 1941 starring Greta Garbo with George Cukor directing. MGM ultimately rejected Huxley's script for Madame Curie as "too literary," and after Garbo's success in Ninotchka, MGM wanted her to star in another romantic comedy. The project was shelved and Garbo left MGM for good in 1942.

MGM's star Joan Crawford was interested in the role Marie as she wanted to play more serious characters but her request was rejected by Mayer. The role went to Greer Garson and Crawford cited this as a reason to leave MGM and sign to Warner Brothers.

Mervyn LeRoy replaced Albert Lewin, who was fired shortly before production began.

While the film is heavily fictionalized for dramatic purposes, the plot managed to adhere to the facts more than most biopics of the 1930s and 40s.  Madame Curie completely omits any mention of Marie's family in Paris, including her sister Bronislawa, an obstetrician, with whom she was very close. There is also virtually no mention of Marie's intense devotion to politics and the liberation/independence of her native Poland.

Author James Hilton was the narrator for this film.

Box office
According to MGM records the film earned $2,575,000 in the US and Canada and $2,035,000 elsewhere resulting in a profit of $1,086,000.

Accolades

Others
The film is recognized by American Film Institute in these lists:
 2003: AFI's 100 Years...100 Heroes & Villains:
 Marie Curie – Nominated Hero
 2006: AFI's 100 Years...100 Cheers – #97

In popular culture
Madame Curie was satirized in a 1976 episode of SCTV as Madame Blitzman (mistakenly shown on 'Monster Chiller Horror Theater') in which Frances Blitzman/Marie Curie (Andrea Martin) works alongside her husband Louis Blitzman/Pierre Curie (Eugene Levy) in creating a life-extension formula derived from radiation exposure. However, Louis suffers from painful recurring headaches which kill him eventually; at a meeting of the 'Academy of Science', an aged Frances reveals that Louis's experiments caused a plaque to grow in his brain, causing the painful headaches which killed him, and which are also affecting her.

References

External links

 
 
 
 
 
 

1943 films
1940s biographical drama films
American biographical drama films
American black-and-white films
Biographical films about scientists
Cultural depictions of Pierre Curie
Films about Nobel laureates
Films directed by Mervyn LeRoy
Films set in Paris
Films set in the 1890s
Films set in the 1900s
Metro-Goldwyn-Mayer films
Films with screenplays by Aldous Huxley
Films scored by Herbert Stothart
Films about Marie Curie
1943 drama films
1940s English-language films
1940s American films